Sabulodes aegrotata, the omnivorous looper,  is a moth of the  family Geometridae. It is found in north-western North America, south to northern California.

The wingspan is 35–44 mm. Adults are on wing year round.

The larvae feed on the foliage of various flowering trees and shrubs, including Alnus, Holodiscus discolor, Rubus spectabilis, Salix and Umbellularia californica.

External links
Macromoths of Northwest Forests and Woodlands
Images
Bug Guide

Ourapterygini